Emmanuel Boat Club (often colloquially referred to as Emma) is the rowing club for members of Emmanuel College, Cambridge. The men's 1st VIII has stayed largely in the first division of the Lent and May Bumps for the last half-century, but fell as low as 21st in the May Bumps in the 1930s, and has been as low as 28th in the Lent Bumps towards the end of the 19th century.

In the Lent Bumps, Emmanuel men gained the headship in 1930, and although they reached 1st position in Lent Bumps 2001, they were not awarded the headship, since the last two days of the races were not completed due to an outbreak of foot and mouth disease in the United Kingdom. Emmanuel did gain the headship at the May Bumps 2001, bumping  on the second day.

The women's side of the club have been extremely successful in recent years, achieving the headship of the Lent Bumps 11 times (the first in 1988 and latest in 2009); more than any other women's boatclub, and the headship of the May Bumps 4 times (the first in 1995). Emmanuel's 1st women's VIII did not drop out of the top 3 crews at Lent Bumps between 1988 and 2005, nor the top 2 places in the May Bumps between 1994 and 2004.

In 2018 Emmanuel's first women and men will start second and seventh on the river respectively, as a result of both crews earning their blades in 2017. It was the second time in the club's history that the first men and women both earned blades in the same year. The first men have been no higher than 7th in May bumps since 2003.

Honours

Henley Royal Regatta

References

External links
 CUCBC/ Cambridge University Combined Boat Club
 Emmanuel Boat Club

Rowing clubs of the University of Cambridge
Boat
Sports clubs established in 1827
1827 establishments in England
Rowing clubs in Cambridgeshire
Rowing clubs in England
Rowing clubs of the River Cam